John Horatio Savigny (25 August 1867 – 11 February 1923) was an Australian cricketer. He played thirteen first-class matches for Tasmania between 1888 and 1911.

Savigny's father William Henry Savigny was headmaster of the Launceston Church Grammar School, and his brother William Savigny was a fine cricketer, playing in three matches for Tasmania against Victoria.

Savigny was employed as a clerk with the Customs Department at Launceston.
He died on the bank of the river Liffey near Carrick, where he had gone fishing, and apparently died while dozing.

On 6 April 1891 he married Emily Henry (c. 1869 – 22 September 1930), second daughter of John Henry, Treasurer of Tasmania. She died at the family home, "Carthona", Ashby Street, Launceston. They had a small family.

See also
 List of Tasmanian representative cricketers

References

External links
 

1867 births
1923 deaths
Australian cricketers
Tasmania cricketers
Cricketers from Tasmania